Habiganj Agricultural University (HAU) is a public agricultural university in Sylhet Division, Bangladesh, established in 2020. It is located at Vadoi, Habiganj Sadar Upazila, Habiganj.

History 
On 24 December 2019, the Cabinet of Bangladesh approved Habiganj Agriculture University Act, 2019 to establish the Habiganj Agricultural University.

Faculties 

 Faculty of Animal Science and Veterinary Medicine
 Faculty of Fisheries
 Faculty of Agriculture
 Faculty of Science and Technology
 Faculty of Arts and Humanities

List of vice-chancellors 

 Md Abdul Baset(present)

References 

Agricultural universities and colleges in Bangladesh
Public universities of Bangladesh